Carlos Costa was the defending champion, but the second seeded Spaniard lost in the first round to Marcelo Filippini because he had to retire. Karel Nováček won in the final 7–5, 6–4, 7–6(9–7) against Richard Fromberg and captured his third title in Hilversum.

Seeds
Champion seeds are indicated in bold while text in italics indicates the round in which that seed was eliminated.

Draw

Finals

Section 1

Section 2

External links
 ATP main draw

Singles